Monir Khan is a Bangladeshi singer. In his career he has released 42 solo albums and more than 300 duet and mixed albums. He has won Bangladesh National Film Awards for three times as the Best Male Playback Singer for his performance in the films Premer Taj Mahal (2001), Laal Doriya (2002) and Dui Noyoner Alo (2005).

Early life
Monir Khan was born on 1 August 1972 in a renowned Muslim family of Madanpur village of Maheshpur upazila of Jhenaidah district. His father Mohammad Mahbub Ali Khan is a retired school teacher and mother Most. Monwara Khatun is a Housewife. Among one sister and four brothers Monir Khan is II and first among the brothers.

Monir Khan's education was started in his village primary school. Later he studied in Hakimpur High School and later in Narayanpur Baharam Uddin High School, Chaugachha, Jessore. He passed the matriculation examination in 1987 and Intermediate from the Kotchandpur Degree College in 1990. He passed his degree from the same college in 1992.

The artist has spent his childhood in his village. Monir Khan has grown up in a joyous environment, playing games with friends, ranching, swimming in pond and fishing. He had an innate attraction towards songs even in the early part of his life.

He has learned music from many of the local scholars. However, music started mainly in Reza Khasrura. Later, he took the music of Swapan Chakraborty, Yunus Ali Mollah, Khandaker Enayet Hossain and some other dignitaries. Khandker Enayet Hossain, a resident of Bagerhat district, used to teach songs after 15 days in Kaliganj Gunjan Shilpi Academy of the district. The foundation of music has been developed mainly by Khandaker Enayet Hossain.

Career
In 1989, Monir Khan was listed as a modern song artist by auditioning on Khulna radio. He started singing as a regular artist till August 1991.
On 5 September 1991 he came to Dhaka with NOC. Even after coming to Dhaka, he learned songs from some of the elders. Among them are Abubakar Siddiq, Mangal Chandra Biswas, Salahuddin Ahmed, Anup Chakraborty and many others. Whenever he got some good things he tried to take his own life.

After so many days he thought of taking a place in the audio market. Started working according to the thought. Originally inspired by Kutti Mansur, Monir Khan decided to release his song songs in the market.

Milton Khondokar agreed to work with Monir Khan and agreed to release audio album. To release audio album, Monir tried to prove herself as a perfect artist through better practice of singing. Monir Khan took four years from 1992 to 1996 to prepare himself.

In 1996, first solo audio album of 12 songs ‘Tomar Kono Dosh Nei’ released from Beauty Corner. The album gets great popularity. After the popularity of the album, Monir Khan became famous overnight. Then Monir Khan did not stop. He has released album one after one and has got success in every album.

Personal life
In 2001, Monir Khan was married to Tahmina Akter. He is the father of Musfika Akhter Muntata (daughter) and Mosabbir Khan Muhurta (son).

Albums
Monir Khan has released 42 solo albums and more than 300 duet and mixed albums, and has song in more than 100 Bengali films.

Discography

Awards
In 2001, Monir Khan was awarded the National Film Award for the first time for vocal in Premer Taj Mahal. Such a great achievement like the National Film Award in such a short time is an important chapter of his life.
In 2002, he received National Film Award for the second time for vocal in Lal Doriya. In 2005, he won the National Film Award for the third time for vocal in Dui Noyoner Alo. The song was Tumi Khub Sadharon Ekti Meye.

Bangladesh National Film Awards

He also received numerous prizes. He has been honored with Bachsas Awards, Bangladesh Television Reports Award, Bangladesh Cultural Reporters Award, and many other awards at home and abroad.

References

External links
 

Living people
20th-century Bangladeshi male singers
20th-century Bangladeshi singers
21st-century Bangladeshi male singers
21st-century Bangladeshi singers
People from Khulna
1972 births
Best Male Playback Singer National Film Award (Bangladesh) winners